The Caragele gas field is a natural gas field located in Luciu, Buzău County. The field discovery was announced on June 30, 2016, by Romgaz the Romanian national gas company. Caragele is part of the company's RG06 concession located in the North-Eastern Muntenia region. It is one of the largest onshore discoveries in Romania in the past 10 years. 

The gas field will begin production after 2020 and will produce natural gas and condensates. The total proven reserves of the Caragele gas field are around 986 billion cubic feet (28.2 km³) with test production situated between 8.12 million cubic feet/day (0.23×105m³) and 12.76 million cubic feet/day (0.365×105m³) for each drilled well.

References

Natural gas fields in Romania